Popovka is a rural locality (a village) in Vozhegodsky District, Vologda Oblast, Russia. The population was 14 as of 2002.

Geography 
The distance to Vozhega is 69 km, to Sosnovitsa is 1 km. Grishinskaya, Sosnovitsa, Vasilyevskaya are the nearest rural localities.

References 

Rural localities in Vozhegodsky District